George Alfred Henty (8 December 1832 – 16 November 1902) was an English novelist and war correspondent. He is most well-known for his works of adventure fiction and historical fiction, including The Dragon & The Raven (1886), For The Temple (1888), Under Drake's Flag (1883) and In Freedom's Cause (1885).

Biography

G. A. Henty was born in Trumpington, near Cambridge but spent some of his childhood in Canterbury. He was a sickly child who had to spend long periods in bed. During his frequent illnesses he became an avid reader and developed a wide range of interests which he carried into adulthood. He attended Westminster School, London, as a half-boarder when he was fourteen, and later Gonville and Caius College, Cambridge, where he was a keen sportsman. He left the university early without completing his degree to volunteer for the (Army) Hospital Commissariat of the Purveyors Department when the Crimean War began. He was sent to the Crimea and while there he witnessed the appalling conditions under which the British soldier had to fight. His letters home were filled with vivid descriptions of what he saw. His father was impressed by his letters and sent them to the Morning Advertiser newspaper which printed them. This initial writing success was a factor in Henty's later decision to accept the offer to become a special correspondent, the early name for journalists now better known as war correspondents.

Shortly before resigning from the army as a captain in 1859 he married Elizabeth Finucane. The couple had four children. Elizabeth died in 1865 after a long illness and shortly after her death Henty began writing articles for the Standard newspaper. In 1866 the newspaper sent him as their special correspondent to report on the Austro-Italian War where he met Giuseppe Garibaldi. He went on to cover the 1868 British punitive expedition to Abyssinia, the Franco-Prussian War, the Ashanti War, the Carlist Rebellion in Spain and the Turco-Serbian War. He also witnessed the opening of the Suez Canal and travelled to Palestine, Russia and India.

Henty was a strong supporter of the British Empire all his life; according to literary critic Kathryn Castle: "Henty ... exemplified the ethos of the [British Empire], and glorified in its successes". Henty's ideas about politics were influenced by writers such as Sir Charles Dilke and Thomas Carlyle.

Henty once related in an interview how his storytelling skills grew out of tales told after dinner to his children. He wrote his first children's book, Out on the Pampas in 1868, naming the book's main characters after his children. The book was published by Griffith and Farran in November 1870 with a title page date of 1871. While most of the 122 books he wrote were for children and published by Blackie and Son of London, he also wrote adult novels, non-fiction such as The March to Magdala and Those Other Animals, short stories for the likes of The Boy's Own Paper and edited the Union Jack, a weekly boy's magazine.

Henty was "the most popular Boy's author of his day." Blackie, who published his children's fiction in the UK, and W. G. Blackie estimated in February 1952 that they were producing about 150,000 Henty books a year at the height of his popularity, and stated that their records showed they had produced over three and a half million Henty books. He further estimated that considering the US and other overseas authorised and pirated editions, a total of 25 million was not impossible. Arnold notes this estimate and that there have been further editions since that estimate was made.

His children's novels typically revolved around a boy or young man living in troubled times. These ranged from the Punic War to more recent conflicts such as the Napoleonic Wars or the American Civil War. Henty's heroes – which occasionally included young ladies – are uniformly intelligent, courageous, honest and resourceful with plenty of 'pluck' yet are also modest. These themes have made Henty's novels popular today among many conservative Christians and homeschoolers.

Henty usually researched his novels by ordering several books on the subject he was writing on from libraries, and consulting them before beginning writing. Some of his books were written about events (such as the Crimean War) that he witnessed himself; hence, these books are written with greater detail as Henty drew upon his first-hand experiences of people, places, and events.

On 16 November 1902, Henty died aboard his yacht in Weymouth Harbour, Dorset, leaving unfinished his last novel, By Conduct and Courage, which was completed by his son Captain C.G. Henty.

Henty is buried in Brompton Cemetery, London.

Influence
G. A. Henty's commercial popularity encouraged other writers to try writing juvenile adventure stories in his style; "Herbert Strang", Henry Everett McNeil, Percy F. Westerman and Captain Frederick Sadleir Brereton all wrote novels in "the Henty tradition", often incorporating then-contemporary themes such as aviation and First World War combat. By the 1930s, however, interest in Henty's work was declining in Britain, and hence few children's writers there looked to his work as a model.

Bibliography

Henty wrote 122 works of historical fiction and all first editions had the date printed at the foot of the title page. Several short stories published in book form are included in this total, with the stories taken from previously published full-length novels. The dates given below are those printed at the foot of the title page of the very first editions in the United Kingdom. It is a common misconception that American Henty titles were published before those of the UK. All Henty titles bar one were published in the UK before those of America. The simple explanation for this error of judgement is that Charles Scribner's Sons of New York dated their Henty first editions for the current year. The first UK editions published by Blackie were always dated for the coming year, to have them looking fresh for Christmas. The only Henty title published in book form in America before the UK book was In the Hands of the Cave-Dwellers dated 1900 and published by Harper of New York. This title was published in book form in the UK in 1903, although the story itself had already been published in England prior to the first American edition, in The Boy's Own Annual.

Misattribution
A book published in 1884 in the "Fireside Henty Series" called  Forest and Frontier  was discovered to be by Thomas M. Newson.

UK and US availability
In the late 1990s, a number of American publishers, such as Polyglot Press (Philadelphia, PA), PrestonSpeed, and the Lost Classics Book Company, began reprinting Henty's books and advocating their usage for conservative homeschoolers. Reprints of all Henty's works are available from modern day British and American publishers. One such publisher and major modern advocate of Henty is the American scientist (biochemist), homeschool curriculum publisher, and Oregon State Senator Arthur B. Robinson, who promotes the use of Henty's books as a supplement to his self-teaching homeschool curriculum.

Controversial views
Henty's views have been contentious; some writers have accused Henty's novels of being aggressively and obstinately nationalist and reactionary in such books as True to the Old Flag (1885) which features a Loyalist protagonist fighting in the American War of Independence, and In the Reign of Terror (1888) and No Surrender! A Tale of the Rising in La Vendée (1900) which are strongly hostile to the French Revolution.

Henty's novel With Lee in Virginia has a protagonist who fights on the side of the Confederacy against the Union.

Henty's popularity amongst homeschoolers is not without controversy. Quoting from the chapter of By Sheer Pluck called "The Negro Character" ("like children"), American television host and political commentator Rachel Maddow called Henty's writings "spectacularly racist". Carpenter and Pritchard note that while "Henty's work is indeed full of racial (and class) stereotypes", he sometimes created sympathetic ethnic minority characters, such as the Indian servant who marries a white woman in With Clive in India, and point out Henty admired the Turkish Empire. Some even accuse Henty of holding blacks in utter contempt, and this is expressed in novels such as By Sheer Pluck: A Tale of the Ashanti War and A Roving Commission, or, Through the Black Insurrection at Hayti. Kathryne S. McDorman states Henty disliked blacks and also, in Henty's fiction, that "Boers and Jews were considered equally ignoble". In By Sheer Pluck: A Tale of the Ashanti War, Mr. Goodenough, an entomologist remarks to the hero: “They [Negroes] are just like children ... They are always either laughing or quarrelling. They are good-natured and passionate, indolent, but will work hard for a time; clever up to a certain point, densely stupid beyond. The intelligence of an average negro is about equal to that of a European child of ten years old. ... They are fluent talkers, but their ideas are borrowed. They are absolutely without originality, absolutely without inventive power. Living among white men, their imitative faculties enable them to attain a considerable amount of civilization. Left alone to their own devices they retrograde into a state little above their native savagery.”

In the Preface to his novel A Roving Commission (1900) Henty claims "the condition of the negroes in Hayti has fallen to the level of that of the savage African tribes" and argues "unless some strong white power should occupy the island and enforce law and order" this situation will not change. In the novel Facing Death: A Tale of the Coal Mines Henty comes down against strikes and has the working class hero of the novel, Jack Simpson, quell a strike among coal miners.

A review by Deirdre H. McMahon in Studies of the Novel in 2010 refers to his novels as jingoist and racist and states that during the previous decade "Numerous reviews in right-wing and conservative Christian journals and websites applaud Henty’s texts as model readings and thoughtful presents for children, especially boys. These reviews often ignore Henty’s racism by packaging his version of empire as refreshingly heroic and patriotic."

In 1888, on the bookjacket for Captain Bayley's Heir, The Times wrote that Henty's character in With Lee in Virginia, "bravely proving his sympathy with the slaves of brutal masters"  escapes through "the devotion of a black servant and of a runaway slave whom he had assisted". The reviewer recommended the book.

List of titles

Adaptation

There is one known instance of a book title by Henty having been filmed, along with nine audio theater productions by Heirloom Audio in their series "The Extraordinary Adventures of G. A. Henty": Under Drake's Flag, With Lee in Virginia, In the Reign of Terror, The Cat of Bubastes, Beric the Briton, The Dragon and the Raven, Wulf the Saxon, Captain Bayley's Heir and In Freedom's Cause. Heirloom Audio's productions have featured several well-known actors, including Golden Globe winner Joanne Froggatt of Downton Abbey and Billy Boyd of The Lord of the Rings. Heirloom Audio was founded by Illinois businessman Bill Heid, who said of Henty, "He took you to places that had great historical significance. It's historical fiction, yet there's very little fiction." Heid said of the characters portrayed in Henty's books and Heirloom Audio's productions, "Who's a real hero? Jay Cutler or Aaron Rodgers, or Francis Drake? Who had the guts, the belief in God's sovereignty? I want to tell the stories that young people think, 'I could imagine doing something like that.' I want them to dream big. There was a time in our country we really had big dreams, thought we could do big things. For some reason, we don't talk like that, take risks like that." Heid added that too often in schools, "history becomes kind of a data dump, dead guys and dates." But with Henty, "History is anything but boring. It's amazing. William Wallace was a real person, had real struggles of his own. He had hopes and dreams and ambitions, struggles like anyone else, doubts and flaws."

Film

A Final Reckoning (1929), American, B&W: Serial/24 reels

Directed by Ray Taylor.
Cast: Frank Clark [Jim Whitney], Newton House, Louise Lorraine, Jay Wilsey, Edmund Cobb.
Universal Pictures Corporation production; distributed by Universal Pictures Corporation.
Scenario by Basil Dickey and George Morgan, from a novel by George Alfred Henty.
Cinematography by Frank Redman.

Twelve episodes (two reels each): [1] "A Treacherous Friend," released 15 April 1929. / Standard 35mm spherical 1.37:1 format. / [?] Website-IMDb lists the release date of the first episode as 15 April 1928.

Audio Theatre Productions
Under Drake's Flag (2013), Heirloom Audio Productions
 In Freedom's Cause (2014), Heirloom Audio Productions
With Lee in Virginia, Heirloom Audio Productions
In the Reign of Terror, Heirloom Audio Productions
The Cat of Bubastes, Heirloom Audio Productions
Beric the Briton, Heirloom Audio Productions
The Dragon and the Raven, Heirloom Audio Productions
Captain Bayley's Heir, Heirloom Audio Productions
Wulf the Saxon, Heirloom Audio Productions

Notes

References

External links

 
 
 
 
  Website of the Henty Society
 Works by and about G. A. Henty at Michigan Digitization Project
 Works about G. A. Henty at BallantyneTheBrave.com
 Alternative article containing additional information
 G.A. Henty Collection at the University of South Florida
 Writing style
 
 

1832 births
1902 deaths
Royal Army Service Corps officers
British Army personnel of the Crimean War
People of the Abyssinian War
People from Weymouth, Dorset
British war correspondents
Novels by G. A. Henty
People from Trumpington
People educated at Westminster School, London
English historical novelists
Burials at Brompton Cemetery
Alumni of Gonville and Caius College, Cambridge
19th-century English novelists
Victorian novelists
Writers of historical fiction set in antiquity
Writers of historical fiction set in the Middle Ages
Writers of historical fiction set in the early modern period
Writers of historical fiction set in the modern age